Dimitrios D. Miaoulis (1836–1899) was a Greek naval officer. He was the son of Dimitrios Miaoulis and grandson of Andreas Miaoulis, the Greek navy's chief commander during the Greek War of Independence.

Biography
He was born in Hydra in 1836 shortly after his father's death. He was highly educated, and enjoyed the favour of King George I of Greece, who appointed him as captain of the royal yacht Amfitriti. Promoted to Captain in 1890, he was appointed Commander of the Hellenic Navy Academy in 1892, which he led until his death in 1899.

References
''This article is translated and is based from the equivalent article at the Greek Wikipedia (el:Main Page)

1836 births
1899 deaths
Hellenic Navy officers
19th-century Greek military personnel
Dimitrios
People from Hydra (island)